Akbar Hashemi Rafsanjani (born Akbar Hashemi Bahramani, 25 August 1934 – 8 January 2017) was an Iranian politician, writer, and one of the founding fathers of the Islamic Republic who was the fourth president of Iran from 1989 to 1997. He was the head of the Assembly of Experts from 2007 until 2011 when he decided not to nominate himself for the post. He was also the chairman of the Expediency Discernment Council.

During his 40-year tenure, Rafsanjani amassed a large amount of power serving as the speaker of parliament, Commander-in-Chief during the Iran–Iraq War, President, and chose Ali Khamenei as the supreme leader of Iran. His powerful role and control over Iranian politics earned him the name "Akbar Shah".

Rafsanjani became president of Iran after winning the 1989 election. He served another term by winning the election in 1993. In the 2005 election he ran for a third term in office, placing first in the first round of elections but ultimately losing to rival Mahmoud Ahmadinejad in the run-off. He and his family faced political isolation for their support of the opposition in 2009. Rafsanjani entered the race for the 2013 presidential election, but he was disqualified by the Guardian Council. With Hassan Rouhani's election, in which Rafsanjani openly supported him, the Rafsanjani family gradually recovered their political reputation. Rafsanjani died in 2017, following a heart attack, in a hospital in Tehran at the age of 82. Although government officials attributed his death to cardiac arrest, his sudden death prompted speculation that he had been assassinated. His family strongly asserted that he had been murdered. Further investigation revealed that his body was highly radioactive.

Rafsanjani has been described as a pragmatic Islamic conservative. The Economist called him a "veteran kingmaker". He supported a capitalist free market position domestically, favoring privatization of state-owned industries and a moderate position internationally, seeking to avoid conflict with the United States and the West. He was also the founder of, and one of the Board of Trustees of, Azad University. In 2003, Forbes estimated his personal wealth to be in excess of US$1 billion.

Early life and education 
Rafsanjani was born on 25 August 1934 in the village of Bahreman near the city of Rafsanjan in Kerman Province, to a wealthy family of pistachio farmers. He had seven siblings. His father, Mirza Ali Hashemi Behramani, was a pistachio merchant, one of Kerman's famous businessmen. His mother, Hajie Khanom Mahbibi Hashemi, died at the age of 90 on 21 December 1995. One of his brothers, Mohammad Hashemi, is the former director of IRIB. From childhood onward Rafsanjani did not see himself as a peasant, according to family members.

He left at the age of 14 to study theology in Qom. There he became acquainted with the ideas of Ayatollah Ruhollah Khomeini, the most senior dissident cleric who later became the founder of the Islamic Republic, on the political rule of the clergy. He studied theology. His other teachers were Seyyed Hossein Borujerdi, Mohammad-Reza Golpaygani, Mohammad Kazem Shariatmadari, Abdul-Karim Ha'eri Yazdi, Shahab al-Din Mar'ashi Najafi, Nematollah Salehi Najafabadi, Muhammad Husayn Tabataba'i, and Hussein-Ali Montazeri.

Political career

Pre-Revolution struggles 
When he was studying at Qom Seminary, he became interested in politics under Ruhollah Khomeini. He was one of the opposers of Mohammad Reza Shah's White Revolution and accompanied Khomeini. With Khomeini's exile, Hashemi's role in the fight against the Shah and representing Khomeini in the country was highlighted. This opposition eventually led to his arrest and imprisonment. He was arrested 7 times from 1960 until 1979 and was in jail for four years and 5 months in total due to his clandestine activities against the Pahlavi regime. Despite the anti-Western attitude of revolutionaries, he had traveled to 20 states of the United States. Khomeini made him the financial manager of the revolutionary struggle as well as the bridge with other revolutionary groups.

Among the groups that had a deep bond with Hashemi, was the Islamic Coalition Party, which is known as responsible for the assassination of former Prime Minister Hassan Ali Mansur. This communication was another reason for his arrest. In prison, he found the opportunity to become familiar with other groups opposed to the Shah.

After the revolution 
After the victory of Iranian Revolution, Hashemi became one of the members of Council of Islamic Revolution. He was one of the powerful members of the council from its establishment. He was also deputy interior minister at that time and later became the acting interior minister.

He was one of the 28 founders of Traditional right-wing Combatant Clergy Association and also one of the members of the central committee of Islamic Republican Party at the first years of the revolution. Years later, it was he who requested IRP's dissolution. His political acumen and Khomeini's full trust helped Rafsanjani as one of the most powerful politicians in Iran at that time. At the time, he was the closest person to the Khomeini and ruled as his  "eyes and ears". According to the Gold, Islamic Revolutionary Guard Corps was established with the help of Hashemi.

During the Iranian hostage crisis in 1980, Hashemi Rafsanjani mentioned it as "one of the largest manufacturer in the history". However, on the tenth anniversary of the revolution, he said in an interview that according to the experiences of these years, the hostage was "wrong".

Hashemi served as one of the Tehran's Friday Prayer Imams (for next thirty years), Representative of Khomeini at Defense High Council (after death of Mostafa Chamran) and Second-in-Command of Iran's Joint Chiefs of Staff in the last year of Iran–Iraq War. He forced Khomeini to accept to end the war. Only three months after his appointment as Iran's deputy commander-in-chief, Iran accepted United Nations Security Council Resolution 598 and eight-year war was ended.

Chairmanship of the Parliament (1980–1989) 

Iran's first Election Law was developed with Hashemi's partnership. He nominated as one of the Islamic Republican Party's candidates in the 1980 legislative election in Tehran. He gained 1,151,514 (54%) votes and ranked 15. Rafsanjani was the Speaker of Parliament of Iran for 9 years. He was elected as the speaker in 1980 in the first season of Parliament after the Iranian Revolution. He was also chairman in the second season and first year of the third parliament. After the death of Ruhollah Khomeini, founder of the Islamic Republic and election of then-President Ali Khamenei as new supreme leader, he joined the 1989 presidential race and became the President, leaving Parliament.

He had a determining role in the dismissal of Abulhassan Banisadr as commander-in-chief of Iranian military and then his impeachment in the parliament as Iran's first president in June 1981. In the summer of 1981, he protested to the veto of the parliament's plan by the Guardian Council and informed it to Ruhollah Khomeini. This led to the establishment of Expediency Discernment Council, which later he chaired the council. He had an active role in Iran–Contra affair, which was divulged by Mehdi Hashemi and failed. Mehdi Hashemi was executed but Rafsanjani was the loser at internal dimension.

In October 1981 presidential election, when he voted to Ali Khamenei, he said it's vote of "Imam (Khomeini), clerics and the parliament". During differences between Prime Minister Mir-Hossein Mousavi and Khamenei, Hashemi cleverly managed to keep the position favor or against these two perspectives and take the middle position. According to Bahman Bakhtiari, at that time Mousavi was the leader of the left-wing, and Khamenei the right-wing. With the death of Khomeini (one of the supporters of leftists), leftists were weakened. In such circumstances, Hashemi leaped for a powerful presidency.

Presidency (1989–1997) 

Rafsanjani adopted an "economy-first" policy, supporting a privatization policy against more state-owned economic tendencies in the Islamic Republic. Another source describes his administration as "economically liberal, politically authoritarian, and philosophically traditional" which put him in confrontation with more radical deputies in the majority in the Majles of Iran.

As president, Rafsanjani was credited with spurring Iran's reconstruction following the 1980–88 war with Iraq. His reforms, despite attempting to curb the powers of the ultra-conservatives, failed to do so, and the Iranian Revolutionary Guards received increasing power from Khamenei during his presidency. He was also accused of corruption by both conservatives and reformists, and was known for tough crackdowns on dissent.

Domestic policy 
Rafsanjani advocated a free market economy. With the state's coffers full, Rafsanjani pursued an economic liberalization policy. Rafsanjani's support for a deal with the United States over Iran's nuclear program and his free-market economic policies contrasted with Mahmoud Ahmadinejad and his allies, who advocate maintaining a hard line against Western intervention in the Middle East while pursuing a policy of economic redistribution to Iran's poor. By espousing World Bank inspired structural adjustment policies, Rafsanjani desired a modern industrial-based economy integrated into the global economy.

Rafsanjani urged universities to cooperate with industries. Turning to the quick pace of developments in today's world, he said that with "the world constantly changing, we should adjust ourselves to the conditions of our lifetime and make decisions according to present circumstances". Among the projects he initiated are Islamic Azad University.

During his presidency, a period in which Rafsanjani is described by western media sources as having been the most powerful figure in Iran, people ordered executed by the judicial system of Iran included political dissidents, drug offenders, Communists, Kurds, followers of the Baháʼí Faith, and even Islamic clerics.

Regarding the Iranian People's Mojahedin Organization of Iran, Rafsanjani said (Ettela'at, 31 October 1981):

Rafsanjani also worked with Khamenei to maintain the stability of government after the death of Khomeini.

Foreign policy 

Following years of deterioration in foreign relations under Khomeini during the Iran–Iraq War, Rafsanjani sought to rebuild ties with Arab states as well as with countries in Central Asia and the Caucasus, including Azerbaijan, Turkmenistan and Kazakhstan. However, relations with European countries and the United States remained poor, even though Rafsanjani had a track record of handling difficult situations and defusing crises.

He condemned both the United States and Ba'athist Iraq during the Persian Gulf War in 1991. After the war he strove to renew close ties with the West, although he refused to lift Khomeini's fatwa against the British author Salman Rushdie for his Satanic Verses.

Rafsanjani said that Iran is ready to assist Iraq, "expecting nothing in return", he also said that "peace and stability" is a function of the "evacuation of the occupiers."

Iran gave humanitarian help to the victims of the conflict. Iran sent truckloads of food and medicine to Iraq, and thousands of Kuwaiti refugees were given shelter in Iran.

Rafsanjani voiced support to Prince Abdullah's peace initiative and to "everything the Palestinians agree to". He also stated that what he called "Iran's international interests" must take precedence over those of Iranian allies in Syria and Lebanon.

Ayatollah Rafsanjani was a supporter of Iran's nuclear program. In 2007 Rafsanjani reiterated that the use of weapons of mass destruction was not part of the Islamic Republic culture. Rafsanjani said: "You [US and allies] are saying that you cannot trust Iran would not use its nuclear achievements in the military industries, but we are ready to give you full assurances in this respect." According to The Economist, he is regarded by many Iranians "as the only person with the guile and clout to strike a deal with the West to end economic sanctions" imposed upon the country due to its nuclear program.

Construction 
After the end of the Iran-Iraq war, the need for a road map for the future was felt in order to end the historical gap between the country Iran development programs in the first government of Hashemi Rafsanjani.
The fifth government soon managed to recover the economy and moved the arrowhead of the indicators in a different direction. The first action of the fifth government was devoted to designing the first development plan of the Islamic Republic of Iran. The men that Hashemi had chosen to run the country took over the task of drafting the plan, and the first development plan was approved by the parliament at the end of 1990. The general goals of this program are rebuilding and equipping the defense base, rebuilding and modernizing production and infrastructure capacities and population centers damaged during the imposed war, quantitative expansion and qualitative improvement of public culture, creating economic growth, providing the minimum basic needs of the people, determining and modifying the pattern Consumption, organization reform and executive and judicial management of the country were considered.
The most important characteristics of the two periods of Hashemi Rafsanjani's government were the developmental and building approach, the establishment of a free economy in the country, and the use of Extraterritorial jurisdiction managers and technocrats. characteristic of the construction government was that it paid much attention to the development of industrial and transportation infrastructure.

After the presidency 

Post-presidency, Rafsanjani delivered a sermon at Tehran University in the summer of 1999 praising government use of force to suppress student demonstrations.

In 2000, in the first election after the end of his presidency, Rafsanjani ran again for Parliament. In the Tehran contest, Rafsanjani came in 30th, or last, place. At first, he was not among the 30 representatives of Tehran elected, as announced by the Iranian Ministry of the Interior, but the Council of Guardians then ruled numerous ballots void, leading to accusations of ballot fraud in Rafsanjani's favor.

In December 2006, Rafsanjani was elected to the Assembly of Experts representing Tehran with more than 1.5 million votes, which was more than any other candidate. Ahmadinejad's opponents won the majority of local election seats. On 4 September 2007 he was elected Chairman of the Assembly of Experts, the body that selects Iran's supreme leader, in what was considered a blow to the supporters of Mahmoud Ahmadinejad. He won the chairmanship with 41 votes of the 76 cast. His ultraconservative opponent, Ayatollah Ahmad Jannati, received 31 votes. Rafsanjani was re-elected to the position on 10 March 2009, running against Mohammad Yazdi. He received 51 votes compared to Yazdi's 26. On 8 March 2011, he withdrew from the election and Ayatollah Mohammad Reza Mahdavi Kani was elected as his replacement.

Following his presidency, Rafsanjani also became an advocate of greater freedom of expression and tolerance in Iranian society. In a speech on 17 July 2009, Rafsanjani criticized restriction of media and suppression of activists, and put emphasis on the role and vote of people in the Islamic Republic constitution. The event has been considered by analysts as the most important and most turbulent Friday prayer in the history of contemporary Iran. Nearly 1.5 to 2.5 million people attended the speech in Tehran.

2009 election protests 

During the 2009 presidential election, Rafsanjani's former rival and incumbent president, Mahmoud Ahmadinejad, won a disputed landslide victory over challenger Mir-Hossein Mousavi. His daughter was arrested on 21 June by plain clothes Basij during the subsequent protest and later sentenced to six months in jail on charges of spreading propaganda against the Islamic Republic.

Ayatollah Hashemi Rafsanjani was chairman of the Assembly of Experts, which is responsible for appointing or removing the Supreme Leader, who has been rumored to not be in the best of health. After the disputed results of the election were certified by the Supreme Leader, Rafsanjani was reported to have called a meeting of the Assembly of Experts, but it is unknown what the outcome or disposition of this meeting actually was. During this time Rafsanjani relocated from Tehran to Qom, where the country's religious leaders sit. However, for the most part, Rafsanjani was silent about the controversial 12 June election and its aftermath.

On 17 July 2009, Rafsanjani publicly addressed the election crisis, mass arrests and the issue of freedom of expression during Friday prayers. The prayers witnessed an extremely large crowd that resembled the Friday prayers early after the revolution. Supporters of both reformist and conservative parties took part in the event. During prayers, Rafsanjani argued the following:

All of us the establishment, the security forces, police, parliament and even protestors should move within the framework of law... We should open the doors to debates. We should not keep so many people in prison. We should free them to take care of their families. ... It is impossible to restore public confidence overnight, but we have to let everyone speak out. ... We should have logical and brotherly discussions and our people will make their judgments. ... We should let our media write within the framework of the law and we should not impose restrictions on them. ... We should let our media even criticize us. Our security forces, our police and other organs have to guarantee such a climate for criticism.

His support for the Green Movement reinvigorated his image among the urban middle-class segments of Iranian society who made up the bulk of the movement and solidified Rafsanjani's role as a backer of factions within Iran that advocated the reform of the system to ensure its survival.

Assembly of Experts election 
On 8 March 2011 Rafsanjani lost his post as chairman of the powerful Assembly of Experts, replaced by Ayatollah Mohammad-Reza Mahdavi Kani. Rafsanjani stated that he withdrew from the election for chairman to "avoid division." The loss was said to be the result of intensive lobbying "in recent weeks" by "hardliners and supporters" of President Mahmoud Ahmadinejad, and part of Rafsanjani's gradual loss of power over the years.

2013 presidential elections 

On 11 May 2013, Rafsanjani registered for the 14 June presidential election with just minutes to spare. Former reformist president Mohammad Khatami endorsed him. However, on 21 May 2013, Iran's electoral center, Guardian Council disqualified him from standing in the presidential election. On 11 June 2013, Rafsanjani endorsed moderate Hassan Rouhani in the elections for Iran's presidency saying the candidate was "more suitable" than others for presidency.

Later years 
Reformers had enjoyed his support in recent years, helping to tilt the balance of power towards more moderate forces who managed to win the presidential poll in 2013 with the victory of Hassan Rouhani and parliamentary elections in 2016.

Rafsanjani could not act as a political horse trader—for example, he could not prevent reformist candidates from being disqualified—but his role in guiding reformist politicians was a crucial one and, up to a point, he was able to influence Khamenei by preventing him from making one-sided decisions. Hardliners now have a chance to completely surround the Supreme Leader and block moderate influences. Rafsanjani played politics the way it was played during the time of Ayatollah Khomeini—or at least, that is what he wanted you to believe—but with his death the so-called "Imam's Line," key figures from the beginning of the Revolution, who were close to Khomeini—is near its end.

He also kept his traditional connections with the clergy in the holy city of Qom and with conservative forces within the political establishment, which made it difficult for hardliners to form a strong front against moderate forces.

After winning reelection to his seat at Assembly of Experts as Tehran district's first person, Rafsanjani announced that it was the last time that he joined an election as a candidate and will be retired from politics at the end of the current term. He also said "Now I can die with peace of mind" after seeing election of a moderate parliament in the 2016 legislative election.

Death 

Rafsanjani died on 8 January 2017, at 19:30 (UTC+03:30) due to a heart attack in a pool. He was brought immediately to Tajrish's Shohada-ye Tajrish Hospital in north Tehran, as reported by Iranian state-run media. He was 82 years old at the time of his death. The government announced three days of national mourning and a public holiday on his funeral day. Black banners were raised in Tehran and other cities and some posters showed the Supreme Leader and Rafsanjani together smiling. Five days of mourning also observed in the southern province of Kerman, where Ayatollah Rafsanjani's hometown of Rafsanjan is located.

Two months after his death, a highway in Northern Tehran was renamed in his honour. Many streets in other cities also named Hashemi Rafsanjani. The central building of Azad University also named as Hashemi Building and a statue of him was installed outside of the building. Kerman International Airport was also renamed to Ayatollah Hashemi Rafsanjani Airport.

In 2018 Hassan Rouhani ordered the Iranian supreme national security council to reopen an investigation into Rafsanjani's death.  Family members stated that although an autopsy had not been performed, the level of radioactivity in his body was "10 times what is considered permissible" and that Rafsanjani's daughter Fatemeh and his wife also had unusually high levels of radioactivity.

Controversies

Accusations 

Rafsanjani was sought by the Argentinian government for ordering the 1994 AMIA bombing in Buenos Aires. It was based on the allegation that senior Iranian officials planned the attack in an August 1993 meeting, including Khamenei, the Supreme Leader, Mohammad Hejazi, Khamenei's intelligence and security advisor, Rafsanjani, then president, Ali Fallahian, then intelligence minister, and Ali Akbar Velayati, then foreign minister.

Tension with Ahmadinejad 
After his loss at the presidential elections in 2005, a growing tension between him and President Ahmadinejad arose. Rafsanjani has criticized Ahmadinejad's administration several times for conducting a purge of government officials, slow move towards privatization and recently hostile foreign policy in particular the atomic energy policy. In return Ahmadinejad fought back that Rafsanjani failed to differentiate privatization with the corrupt takeover of government-owned companies and of foreign policies which led to sanctions against Iran in 1995 and 1996. He also implicitly denounced Rafsanjani and his followers by calling those who criticize his nuclear program as "traitors".

During a debate with Mir-Hossein Moussavi in 2009 presidential election, Ahmadinejad accused Hashemi of corruption. Hashemi released an open letter in which he complained about what he called the president's "insults, lies and false allegations" and asked the country's supreme leader, Ali Khamenei, to intervene.

Tension with Khamenei 
In his latter years, Rafsanjani had disagreements with Ali Khamenei who has the last say in everything in Iran. Khamenei even indirectly called Rafsanjani a traitor. Following his death, Khamanei said of Rafsanjani, " I don’t know any other figure with whom I have had so many shared experiences and long history in ups and downs of this era which made history."

Views 

According to him, the problem of having political party undertook by common sense and people. In other word Islam has not definite opinion on parties. Islam placed the duty of having party on the shoulders of peoples themselves. Islam has not any disagreement with partition. He believes that all parties before Islamic revolution in Iran controlled by Shah Regime and there was no original party in that time. In fact with victory of Islamic revolution, the existence of part becomes necessary for revolution.

Political parties 
Before Iranian Revolution, Rafsanjani was active in the anti-Shah activities and reportedly associated with the Islamic Coalition's shura-ye ruhaniyat and the People's Mujahedin.

Although Rafsanjani was a member of the pragmatic-conservative Combatant Clergy Association, he had a close bond to the Executives of Construction Party and Moderation and Development Party. In 2009, Rafsanjani ceased activity in the Combatant Clergy Association, despite remaining a member.

He was regarded as flip-flopping between conservative and reformist camps since the election of Mohammad Khatami, supporting reformers in that election, but going back to the conservative camp in the 2000 parliamentary elections as a result of the reformist party severely criticizing and refusing to accept him as their candidate. Reformists, including Akbar Ganji, accused him of involvement in murdering dissidents and writers during his presidency. In the end, the major differences between the Kargozaran and the reformists party weakened both and eventually resulted in their loss at the presidential elections in 2005. However, Rafsanjani regained close ties with the reformers since he lost the 2005 presidential elections to Mahmoud Ahmadinejad.

Islamic Republican Party 

Hashemi refers to the point that the Islamic Republican Party established in the early years of revolution in Iran. Ruhollah Khomeini, at first step, was disagree with establishment of Party because he known the establishment of party as something gradually. But After consultation of Hashemi with Khomeini, the opinion of Khomeini has changed. There were many negotiations and consultations on the instructions of Party. People like Yadollah Sahabi and Habibollah Peyman were to communicate but after a while there were no communication with them. Although Mortaza Motahhari had not any disagreement to establishing party but at the same time he hadn't any communication with party. In fact, the idea of establishment of republic party was necessary in order to give the Mullahs an organization and political collection. The party has established formally on 17 February 1979, namely two weeks after the victory of Islamic Revolution. The members of the party even determined their members in Kanoon Touhid in early days. The financial expenses of party originated from the voluntary aids of people. At first, religious scholars or clerics took part in the party. In early days there were no financial problem but after a while the problem appeared. Khomeini tried to give financial aid to the party with giving money. The members primarily chose from revolutionary individuals and believed persons.

Electoral history

Personal life 

From his marriage to Effat Marashi in 1958, Rafsanjani had three sons: Mohsen, Mehdi, and Yasser, as well as two daughters, Fatemeh and Faezeh. Only Faezeh Hashemi chose a political life, which led to her becoming a Majlis representative and then the publisher of the weekly newspaper Zan (meaning Woman in English), which was closed in February 1999. In 2016, his daughter, Faezeh Hashemi, sparked a debate on religious persecution in Iran by visiting the female leader of the persecuted Baháʼí religious minority. The two women had met in prison, when Faezeh was serving a six-month sentence for "spreading propaganda against the system". Rafsanjani's daughter, Fatemeh is President of Charity Foundation for Special Diseases and Mohsen was chairman of Tehran Metro Organization and now is vice president of Azad University. His wife, Effat is the granddaughter of Mohammed Kazem Yazdi.

Family tree

Assets 
The Rafsanjani family took their name from his great grandfather, whose last name was Hashem. When Akbar Hashemi was born, his father was a rich businessman with a valuable pistachio business.

Hashemi and his partners also owned Islamic Azad University, worth an estimated US$20–25 billion.

Assassination attempts 

Only months after the revolution, Rafsanjani was shot once in the stomach by gunmen from one of the groups vying for power amid the political turmoil. He was not seriously wounded, and neither was his wife who jumped in front to shield him from the attack. "Great men of history do not die", Khomeini said in announcing that Rafsanjani had survived.

Books 
 Memories
 The Combat Era is the title of his book on the events before the 1979 revolution. His devotion to Rouhollah Khomeini, his sympathy with the national movement including Mohammad Mosaddegh and Mahdi Bazargan is seen in this book. In this book, he even shows interest in western democracy.
 Amir Kabir: the Hero of Fighting against Imperialism (1968)
 Tafsir Rahnama
 Explicit Letters

In addition, the full text of his Friday Prayer sermons and his congress keynote speeches are also published separately. Based on his diary, viewpoints, speeches and interviews, several independent books have been published so far.
Encyclopedia of Quran (Farhang-e-Quran)
The book in fact considered as a key to the subjects and concepts of Quran. The book has been written by Hashemi and several other scholars.

Analysis 
Although he was a close follower of Ayatollah Khomeini and considered as a central elite during Islamic revolution, at the same time he was fan of reconstruction of shattered country after war and according to this fact, he selected his cabinets from western-educated technocrats and social reformers. His cabinet largely was a reformist one. Rafsanjani acquired both the support of Imam Khomeini in one hand and Majlis in other hand. In fact, he tried to transfer the economy towards the free-market system. There was a gap among Rafsanjani and Khatami and reform agenda because of his partnership with those who were conservative. The first face of reformist movements began by Rafsanjani.

See also 

 Government of Akbar Hashemi Rafsanjani (1989–97)
List of Ayatollahs
List of members in the First Term of the Council of Experts

References

Further reading 
Torbat, Akbar (2017), The Legacy Of Iran’s Powerful Cleric Akbar Hashemi Rafsanjani
 Pesaran, Evaleila, Iran's Struggle for Economic Independence: Reform and Counter-Reform in the Post-Revolutionary Era, Editor: Taylor & Francis
 Amir Arjomand, Said, After Khomeini: Iran Under His Successors , Editor: Oxford University Press
 Moin, Baqer, (1999) Khomeini: Life of the Ayatollah, Editor: I.B.Tauris
 Nabavi, Negin,Iran: From Theocracy to the Green Movement, Editor: Palgrave Macmillan

External links 

Official
 Akbar Hashemi Rafsanjani's Official Website

Other
 All News About Akbar Hashemi Rafsanjani
 Iranian Economy in Six Snapshots
 Rafsanjani's response to some allegations (ISNA, in Persian)
 ISNA interview with Mohsen Hashemi Rafsanjani about the Rafsanjani family (in Persian)
 Friday Sermon at Tehran University: We Will Soon Join The Nuclear Club – For Peaceful Purposes (video clip from 3 December 2004)
 Video Archive of Akbar Hashemi Rafsanjani
 "The U.S. and Iran" by George Church
 Arms for Hostage Deals

|-

|-

|-

|-

|-

|-

|-

|-

 
1934 births
2017 deaths
Centrism in Iran
Combatant Clergy Association politicians
Executives of Construction Party politicians
Government ministers of Iran
Iran–Contra affair
Iranian ayatollahs
Iranian businesspeople
Iranian memoirists
Central Council of the Islamic Republican Party members
Members of the 1st Islamic Consultative Assembly
Members of the 2nd Islamic Consultative Assembly
Members of the Expediency Discernment Council
People from Rafsanjan
People of the Iranian Revolution
Presidents of Iran
Recipients of the Order of Fath
Speakers of the Assembly of Experts
Speakers of the Islamic Consultative Assembly
Council of the Islamic Revolution members
Spiritual leaders of political parties in Iran
Islamic Coalition Party politicians
Iranian people of the Iran–Iraq War
Early People's Mojahedin Organization of Iran members
Members of the Tajik Academy of Sciences